Pacifica is the third studio album by Australian electronic duo The Presets. The album was released in Australia by Modular Recordings on 7 September 2012. It was released the following week (14 September 2012) by Casablanca / Universal Republic.  The album features the singles "Youth in Trouble", "Ghosts", "Promises", "Fall" and "Push". The album was Triple J's Feature Album, Radar Radio's Feature Album and Fbi Radio's Sunset Album. The album was produced by The Presets and mixed by Tony Hoffer. The track "Ghosts" featured on the soundtrack of FIFA 13.

At the J Awards of 2012, the album was nominated for Australian Album of the Year.

Background and release
The Presets recorded the album in Sydney and Los Angeles. The bulk of the album was recorded at the home studios of Julian Hamilton and Kim Moyes, with additional drum sessions taking place in Los Angeles with Joe Baressi and Sean Beavan. The Presets returned to Los Angeles to mix the album with Tony Hoffer.

Writing sessions for the album began as early as 2009. The band worked on as many as 30 songs towards the album. However it was towards the end of 2011 that the bulk of sessions came together.

Pacifica was released in Australia on 7 September 2012. In Australia the album was released on compact disc (the first pressing with a lenticular sleeve), gatefold vinyl album, deluxe box set (featuring, CD, vinyl album, lithograph and expanded artwork), and digital download.

Critical reception

Both singles released from the Pacifica album made the ARIA charts; "Youth in Trouble" peaked at 13 on the ARIA club tracks chart, while accompanying single "Ghosts" peaked at 16. The album peaked at number three on the ARIA albums chart.

Track listing

Album credits
 Joe Barresi – engineer
 Sean Beavan – engineer
 Chris Claypool – assistant
 Dave Cooley – mastering
 Glen Goetze – A&R
 Julian Hamilton – engineer, producer
 Tony Hoffer – additional production, mixing
 Analiese Ifould – stylist
 Wade Keighran – engineer
 Will Larnach-Jones – management
 Kim Moyes – engineer, producer
 Jun Murakawa – assistant
 Jon Nicholson – drum technician
 Jonathan Zawada – art direction, design

Charts

Weekly charts

Year-end charts

Release history

References 

2012 albums
The Presets albums
Modular Recordings albums